The 2011 FC Astana season was the third successive season that the club played in the Kazakhstan Premier League, the highest tier of association football in Kazakhstan. 
It was their first season competing as FC Astana having changed their name from Lokomotiv Astana, finishing the season in fourth place in the league and reaching the Second Round of the  Kazakhstan Cup.

Squad

Transfers

Winter

In:

Out:

Summer

In:

Out:

Competitions

Super Cup

Premier League

First round

Results summary

Results

League table

Championship Round

Results summary

Results

Table

Kazakhstan Cup

Squad statistics

Appearances and goals

|-
|colspan="14"|Players away from Astana on loan:

|-
|colspan="14"|Players who appeared for Astana that left during the season:

|}

Goal scorers

Clean sheets

Disciplinary record

References

FC Astana seasons
Astana
Astana